Helen Furnace is an unincorporated community in Clarion County, in the U.S. state of Pennsylvania.

History
"Helen" most likely is a corruption of Hielander/Highlander, this name being adopted because a first settler was a Scottish Highlander. Variant names are "Helen" and "Hieland Furnace".

References

Unincorporated communities in Pennsylvania
Unincorporated communities in Clarion County, Pennsylvania